Pearre is a surname. Notable people with the name include:

Caroline Neville Pearre (1834–1910), American Christian
Charles Pearre Cabell (1903–1971), United States Air Force General and Deputy Director of the Central Intelligence Agency
George Alexander Pearre (1860–1923), American politician

See also 
Pearre-Metcalfe House, is a historic home located at New Windsor, Frederick County, Maryland, United States